The 2009 GEMAX Open was a professional tennis tournament played on carpet courts. It was part of the Tretorn SERIE+ of the 2009 ATP Challenger Tour. It took place in Belgrade, Serbia between 16 and 22 February 2009.

Singles main-draw entrants

Seeds

 Rankings are as of February 9, 2009.

Other entrants
The following players received wildcards into the singles main draw:
  Toni Androić
  Filip Krajinović
  Janko Tipsarević
  Nenad Zimonjić

The following players received entry from the qualifying draw:
  Matthias Bachinger
  Dominik Hrbatý
  Dieter Kindlmann
  Harel Levy

Champions

Men's singles

 Viktor Troicki def.  Dominik Hrbatý, 6–4, 6–2

Men's doubles

 Michael Kohlmann /  Philipp Marx def.  Aisam-ul-Haq Qureshi /  Lovro Zovko, 3–6, 6–2, 10–8

External links

GEMAX Open
Tennis tournaments in Serbia
GEMAX Open
GEMAX Open
GEMAX Open